Mango is a yellow color that resembles mangoes. It is named after the fruit.

It is currently unknown when mango was first used as a colour name in English.

See also
List of colors

References

External links
 Explore colors - mango on Crayola website